Taylor Ray (born 22 April 2001) is an Australian soccer player who plays as a midfielder for Sydney FC of the A-League Women.

Club career

Sydney FC
Ray made her senior debut for Sydney FC on the 9th of December 2017 in a 3–1 win against Western Sydney Wanderers.

International career
In June 2022, after an impressive season with Sydney FC, Ray was called up to Australia's senior national team for their upcoming friendlies against Spain and Portugal.

References

2001 births
Living people
Australian women's soccer players
Women's association football defenders
Sydney FC players
Sydney FC (A-League Women) players
Australia women's international soccer players